Yow Yeh is a Chinese surname. Notable people with the surname include:

 Jharal Yow Yeh (born 1989), Australian professional rugby league player
 Kevin Yow Yeh (1941−1975), Australian professional rugby league player

Chinese-language surnames